Bromide can refer to:

In chemistry
 Bromide, the anion of bromine, or any ionic salt containing bromide as the only anion, or (as a common name) any covalent compound containing bromine in the -1 oxidation state.
 Potassium bromide, an anticonvulsant and sedative (most pharmacologic information is here).
 Sodium bromide, an anticonvulsant and sedative.

In geography
 Bromide, Oklahoma, a small village in the southern central part of the state.
 Bromide Basin, a basin in Utah.

In language
 Bromide (language), a figure of speech meaning a tranquilizing phrase, cliché or platitude used as a verbal sedative.

In photography
 Bromide (Japanese culture), commercial photographic portraits of celebrities including geisha, singers, actors and sports-people.
 Bromide paper, paper coated with an emulsion of silver bromide, used primarily for photographic prints.